Tillett or Tillet is a French surname that may refer to
Barbara Tillett (born 1946), American librarian and library scholar 
 Ben Tillett (1860–1943), British politician and trade unionist
 Évrard Titon du Tillet (1677–1762), French biographer
 Gladys Avery Tillett (1891–1984), American political organizer
 iO Tillett Wright, American author, photographer, TV host, and activist
 Jacob Henry Tillett (1818–1892), English politician
 Jacques du Tillet (1857–1942), French author and critic
 John Tillett (British Army officer) (1919–2014), British Army officer
 Louis Tillett (born 1959), Australian rock music singer-songwriter, keyboardist and saxophonist
Louis Tillett (politician) (1865–1929), British politician
 Mathieu Tillet (1714–1791), French scientist and administrator
 Maurice Tillet (1903–1954), French poet and wrestler
 Wilbur Fisk Tillett (1854–1936), American clergyman and educator
 William S. Tillett (1892–1974), American internist and microbiologist

Évrard Titon du Tillet (1677–1762), French historian
Jacques du Tillet (1857–1942), French author and critic 
Jean du Tillet (died 1570), French Catholic bishop
Salamishah Tillet (born 1975), American scholar, activist, social critic, and media personality

French-language surnames